Citron is a surname. Notable people with the surname include:

Danielle Citron, American law professor and author
Gerry Citron (1935–2005), British footballer
Jason Citron, software engineer and social media entrepreneur, one of the founders of Discord
Jeffrey A. Citron, American business executive
Michelle Citron (1973–present), American feminist studies scholar, film, video, and multimedia artist, and author
Minna Citron (1896–1991), American painter and printmaker
Robert Citron (1925–2013), American politician, tax collector, money manager, and rogue securities trader
Bob Citron (1932–2012), American entrepreneur and aerospace engineer
Lana Citron (born 1969), Irish author, poet, and screenwriter
Marcia Citron (born 1945), American musicologist, educator, and author
Neil Citron, Canadian guitarist
Pierre Citron (1919–2010), French musicologist, author, and professor
Sabina Citron (born 1928), Polish-born Canadian activist, author, and Holocaust survivor
Samuel Leib Zitron ( S. L. Citron; 1860–1930), Russian Hebrew and Yiddish writer, translator, historian, and literary critic
Sloane Citron (born 1956), American magazine publisher
Stephen Citron (1924–2013), American songwriter, pianist, critic, and biographer
William M. Citron (1896–1976), American politician and lawyer
Sonia Citron (born 2003), Notre Dame women’s basketball player

See also
Citroen (surname), a similarly spelled surname
Citron (Citrus medica), a large fragrant citrus fruit with a thick rind 
Citron (disambiguation)
Robert Citrone (born 1964), American hedge fund manager and corporate-bond analyst

Jewish surnames